VotingWorks is a nonprofit organization that creates and sells open-source voting systems in the U.S. They currently have three products: one for casting and counting ballots, another, named Arlo, for risk-limiting audits (RLAs), and a third for accessible at-home voting.

Organization 
VotingWorks is a 501(c)3 founded in 2018. At the time, the next youngest election systems provider in the United States was 13 years older, with the second youngest being 40 years older. Ben Adida, who helped found the organization, holds a PhD from MIT in cryptography with a focus on elections and had previously worked as the Director of Engineering at Mozilla and Square. VotingWorks had a staff of 15 as of 2021.

Adoption 
In 2019, VotingWorks piloted its election systems for vote counting in the primary and general elections in Choctaw County, Mississippi, thanks in part to a favorable regulatory environment. Since then, other counties in Mississippi have signed-on and the state of New Hampshire has conducted a pilot, with other counties such as San Francisco looking to work with VotingWorks.

Risk-limiting audits have also been performed using VotingWorks' other product, Arlo, in a few states including in Georgia.

*select local jurisdictions (vs. statewide use)

See also 
Open-source voting systems

References

Voting in the United States
Non-profit organizations based in Mississippi